All-American Publications was one of two American comic book companies that merged to form the modern day DC Comics, one of the two largest publishers of comic books in the United States. Superheroes created for All-American include the original Atom, Flash, Green Lantern, Hawkman, and Wonder Woman, all in the 1940s' Golden Age of Comic Books.

Publishing history
Max Gaines, future founder of EC Comics, formed All-American Publications in 1938 after successfully seeking funding from Harry Donenfeld, CEO of both National Allied Publications (publisher of Action Comics and other titles) and sister company Detective Comics (publisher of that namesake comic book). As Gerard Jones writes of Donenfeld's investment:

While All-American, at 225 Lafayette Street in Manhattan, was physically separated from DC's office space uptown at 480 Lexington Avenue, it used the informal "DC" logo on most of its covers for distribution and marketing reasons. In 1944, Gaines sold his share of the company to Liebowitz, keeping only Picture Stories from the Bible as the foundation of his own new company, EC. As Jones describes,

Before the merger, Gaines first rebranded All-American with its own logo, beginning with books cover-dated February 1945: All-Flash #17, Sensation Comics #38, Flash Comics #62, Green Lantern #14, Funny Stuff #3, and Mutt & Jeff  #16, and the following month's All-American Comics #64 and the hyphenless All Star Comics #24. Liebowitz later merged his and Donenfeld's companies into National Comics Publications.

Creative legacy

During All-American's existence, much cross-promotion took place between the two editorially independent companies, so much so that the first appearance of the Justice Society of America, in All Star Comics #3 (Winter 1940/41), included in its roster All-American characters the Atom, the Flash, Green Lantern and Hawkman, and the National characters Doctor Fate, Hour-Man (as it was then spelled), the Spectre, and the Sandman — creating comics' first intercompany crossover, with characters from different companies interacting — although National's Sandman, Spectre and Hour-Man had previously appeared in solo adventures in All Star Comics #1 (Summer 1940).

With Gaines as editor, assisted by Sheldon Mayer, All-American Publications launched its flagship series All-American Comics with an April 1939 premiere. Like many comics of the time, All-American debuted with a mix of newspaper comic strips, reprinted in color, and a smattering of original, comic-strip-like features. Among the strips were three hits of the era: Mutt and Jeff, by Al Smith ghosting for strip creator Bud Fisher; Skippy, by Percy Crosby; and Toonerville Folks by Fontaine Fox. New content included Scribbly, a semiautobiographical Mayer feature about a boy cartoonist. All-American Comics lasted 102 issues through October 1948.

Also debuting that month was Movie Comics ("A full movie show for 10 cents"), featuring simple adaptations of movies using painted movie stills, as well as cartoonist Ed Wheelan's popular Minute Movies comics.  The first of its six issues through Aug. 1939 adapted no fewer than five films: Son of Frankenstein, Gunga Din, The Great Man Votes, Fisherman's Wharf, and Scouts to the Rescue.

The next two comics were Mutt & Jeff, which ran 103 issues from Summer 1939 - June 1958; and the company's superhero debut, Flash Comics #1 (Jan. 1940), which introduced the super-speedster title character, created by writer Gardner Fox and artist Harry Lampert, as well as the Golden Age Hawkman and future Hawkgirl, by Fox and artist Dennis Neville, and Johnny Thunder, by scripter John Wentworth and artist Stan Aschmeier, among other features.

The Golden Age Green Lantern, from Batman writer Bill Finger and artist Martin Nodell, debuted in All-American Comics #16 (July 1940), followed by the original Atom, created by Bill O'Connor and penciler Ben Flinton, in All-American #19 (Nov. 1940). Wonder Woman was introduced in a nine-page story in All Star Comics #8 (Jan. 1942), the product of psychologist William Moulton Marston (under the pseudonym Charles Moulton) and Max Charles Gaines, and drawn by artist Harry G. Peter.

All-American characters

Superhero/masked crimefighter
 The Atom
 Doctor Mid-Nite
 The Flash
 The Gay Ghost
 Green Lantern
 Hawkman and Hawkgirl
 Hop Harrigan
 The King
 Little Boy Blue and the Blue Boys
 Mr. Terrific
 Sargon the Sorcerer
 Johnny Thunder
 Gary Concord, the Ultra-Man
 The Whip
 Wildcat
 Wonder Woman

Adventurer/war
 The Black Pirate
 Gunner Godbee
 Red, White and Blue (Red Dugan, Whitey Smith, Blooey Blue)

Talking-animal/other humor
 Bulldog Drumhead
 The Red Tornado
 Scribbly the Boy Cartoonist

Notes

References

External links
 DC Comics, and The Justice Society of America at Don Markstein's Toonopedia
DC Comics Timeline, SupermanArtists.comics.org

 
1938 establishments in New York City
1944 disestablishments in New York (state)
Publishing companies based in New York City
American companies established in 1938
American companies disestablished in 1944
Publishing companies established in 1938
Publishing companies disestablished in 1944
1944 mergers and acquisitions